Boötes II or Boo II is a dwarf spheroidal galaxy situated in the constellation Boötes and discovered in 2007 in the data obtained by Sloan Digital Sky Survey. The galaxy is located at the distance of about 42 kpc from the Sun and moves towards the Sun with the speed of 120 km/s. It is classified as a dwarf spheroidal galaxy (dSph) meaning that it has an approximately round shape with the half-light radius of about 51 pc.

Boötes II is one of the smallest and faintest satellites of the Milky Way—its integrated luminosity is about 1,000 times that of the Sun (absolute visible magnitude of about −2.7), which is much lower than the luminosity of the majority of  globular clusters. However the mass of the galaxy is substantial corresponding to the mass to light ratio of more than 100.

The stellar population of Boötes II consists mainly of moderately old stars formed 10–12 billion years ago. Currently there is no star formation in Boötes II. The measurements have so far failed to detect any neutral hydrogen in it—the upper limit is only 86 solar masses.

Boötes II is located only 1.5 degrees (~1.6 kpc) away from another dwarf galaxy—Boötes I, although they are unlikely to be physically associated because they move in opposite directions relative to the Milky Way. Their relative velocity—about 200 km/s is too high. It is more likely associated with the Sagittarius Stream and, therefore, with the Sagittarius Dwarf Elliptical Galaxy (SagDEG). Boötes II may be either a satellite galaxy of SagDEG or one of its star clusters torn from the main galaxy 4–7 billion years ago.

Notes

References

Dwarf spheroidal galaxies
4713552
Boötes
Local Group
Milky Way Subgroup
Astronomical objects discovered in 2007